Nathan Bedford Forrest II (August 1871 – March 11, 1931) was an American businessman who served as the 19th Commander-in-Chief of the Sons of Confederate Veterans from 1919 to 1921, and as the Grand Dragon of the Ku Klux Klan for Georgia. Forrest was born in Oxford, Mississippi, in 1871. His grandfather, Nathan Bedford Forrest, was a senior officer of the Confederate States Army who commanded cavalry in the Western Theater of the American Civil War. His only son, Nathan Bedford Forrest III, was a senior officer of the United States Army Air Forces killed in action in the European Theater of World War II.

In the Confederate Veteran, Nathan Bedford Forrest II claimed that he and Tate Brady were making plans together for an "active campaign throughout Oklahoma" as an act of terrorism against the U.S. Government and on behalf of the Sons of Confederate Veterans. He served as Secretary and Business Manager at Lanier University, a college that was sold to the Klan in 1921.

See also
 List of commanders-in-chief of the Sons of Confederate Veterans

References

1871 births
1931 deaths
20th-century American businesspeople
Burials in Tennessee
Commanders-in-chief of the Sons of Confederate Veterans
Deaths from cerebrovascular disease
Forrest family
Ku Klux Klan Grand Dragons
People from Oxford, Mississippi